The 2024 Nevada Senate election will be held on Tuesday, November 5, 2024. Voters in 10 districts of the Nevada Senate will elect their senators. The elections will coincide with the elections for other offices, including for U.S. President, U.S. Senate, U.S. House and the Nevada Assembly. Republicans need to gain three seats to win control of the chamber.

The primary elections will be held on Tuesday, June 11, 2024.

Background 
In the 2022 Nevada State Senate election, Democrats maintained control of the Nevada Senate by a 13–8 margin. Democrats have controlled the chamber since 2016.

See also 
 2024 Nevada elections

References

State Senate
Nevada Senate
Nevada Senate elections